William F. Rasmussen (born October 15, 1932) is an American sports director, and one of the founders of ESPN, along with Scott Rasmussen and Ed Eagan. Rasmussen served as the first president and CEO of ESPN. ESPN was founded on July 14, 1978, and was launched on September 7, 1979.

Early life
Rasmussen was born in Chicago, Illinois, where he attended Gage Park High School. He received a scholarship to attend DePauw University in Indiana, where he met his future wife Mickey. After college, he was a supply officer in the US Air Force. He played baseball (as third baseman) with the hopes of going pro. Parts he procured for the Air Force were used in F-86 and F-89 fighter jets, as well as on Mercury space capsules. He then attended Rutgers University to get his MBA. His son Scott was born in 1956, the year he was discharged from the military.

Career
Rasmussen's career in the media began in western Massachusetts's Pioneer Valley, at radio station WTTT (1430 AM) in Amherst in 1963. In 1965, he moved south to Springfield, working for both of the city's television stations. First, he worked at WHYN (today's WGGB, channel 40), then WWLP (channel 22), where he spent eight years as a sports director, then two as a news director. In 1974 he moved south to Hartford, Connecticut, to join the New England Whalers of the World Hockey Association as their communications director. At the conclusion of the 1977–78 season, Rasmussen was fired by the Whalers. Thus began the pursuit of ESPN, incorporating the fledgling network on July 14, 1978.

ESPN 
ESPN, originally called Entertainment and Sports Programming, was incorporated on July 14, 1978. It began broadcasting fourteen months later, at 7 p.m. on September 7, 1979. ESPN wound up being headquartered in Bristol, Connecticut. Rasmussen paid $18,000 for the first acre of ESPN's campus.

Getty Oil purchased 85% of ESPN and left 15% of the enterprise to be split.

By July 18, 1979, before launch, the investors decided to remove Rasmussen from power. His salary and responsibilities were cut.

Just prior to the launch of ESPN, according to the book Those Guys Have All the Fun: Inside the World of ESPN  Stuart Evey claimed "I made Bill Chairman, but in no way did I want to give him any responsibility!" "Having Bill Rasmussen play a significant role was just not part of the deal." Rasmussen, the one who had the idea for ESPN, stepped back from day-to-day business, having less contact with ESPN until mid 1999. Rasmussen and ESPN "made amends" in 1999 when then-president George Bodenheimer reached out to the founder for the network's 20th anniversary.

On September 30, 1980, ESPN officials announced that Bill Rasmussen was leaving the company by agreement.

The New York Times reported in 1984 that ABC purchased controlling interest in ESPN by buying out Getty Oil's position. At the time of the Getty Oil buy out, ABC in turn bought out the Rasmussen Families 15% for $6,000,000. Rasmussen had to split the $6,000,000 with numerous other investors and funders such as his brother Don Rasmussen, with Bill Rasmussen ending up with an estimated $1.2 million and a little over $740,000 after taxes.

George Bodenheimer, then president of ESPN, recognized Rasmussen in October 2005 and dedicated a plaque and flag pole in Rasmussen's honor.

Enterprise Radio Network 
The all sports radio network Enterprise Radio Network was founded in January 1981 by Scott Rasmussen, the son of Bill Rasmussen, and was shuttered by September 1981. The network broadcast sports reports twice an hour and did live phone in sports talk from 6 pm to 8 am Eastern Time seven days a week. The project failed, with employees not getting paid all wages they were due. Bill Rasmussen was sued by the labor department along with Scott for allegedly violating the Fair Labor Standards Act of 1938.

Other business
Rasmussen became involved in plans to build a 12,000-seat golf stadium in Naples, Florida. The project was rife with corruption, with the Naples Daily News describing it as the "biggest public corruption scandal in local history". Rasmussen became a subject of the criminal investigations surrounding the project and pled guilty to two misdemeanor cases of fraud in a plea deal that reduced the charges against him in exchange for his cooperation in the corruption case against the public officials.

Personal life
In July 2019, Rasmussen disclosed that he had been diagnosed with Parkinson's disease.

Honors and awards 
A United States Air Force veteran, Rasmussen received his bachelor's degree in Economics from DePauw University (Greencastle, Indiana) and his MBA from Rutgers University.
CynopsisMedia – Sports Hall Of Fame

References

Presidents of ESPN
People from Chicago
American people of Danish descent
American television executives
DePauw University alumni
Rutgers University alumni
Living people
1932 births
People with Parkinson's disease
World Hockey Association broadcasters
Hartford Whalers announcers